Leona Belle Helton (born January 7, 1943, in Vienna, Missouri, United States) is an American country music singer known professionally as Leona Williams. Active since 1958, Williams has been a backing musician for Loretta Lynn and Merle Haggard and The Strangers. (She and Haggard were married between 1978 and 1983.) She also charted eight times on Hot Country Songs, with her only Top 40 hit being a duet with Haggard titled "The Bull and the Beaver."

Biography
Leona Belle Helton was born January 7, 1943, in Vienna, Missouri. Active in her family's band since childhood, she had a radio program on KWOS in Jefferson City, Missouri, when she was fifteen. Later on, she worked as a bass guitarist and backing vocalist in Loretta Lynn's road band. By 1968, Williams signed to the Hickory record label and released two singles: "Once More" and "Country Girl with Hot Pants On." In 1976, she recorded the album San Quentin's First Lady for MCA Records with The Strangers, which was the first country album recorded by a female artist inside a prison. She also joined Merle Haggard's road band The Strangers in the mid-1970s, supplanting his estranged wife, Bonnie Owens. Leona wrote two of Merle's No. 1 hits, "Someday When Things Are Good", and "You Take Me For Granted".  She also wrote songs for Connie Smith--"Dallas", Loretta Lynn--"Get Whatcha Got And Go", and others.  Between 1978 and 1983, she was married to Haggard, and in 1978, the two charted in the country Top Ten with the song "The Bull and the Beaver." She recorded two singles for Elektra Records in 1981, and charted another duet with Haggard titled "We're Strangers Again." She later married singer-songwriter Dave Kirby in 1985, and remained married to him until his 2004 death. From 2005 she was with Ferlin Husky, and remained with him for the last six years of his life.  Williams continues to tour with her son, Ron.

In 2017, Williams won the Honky Tonk Female honour at the Ameripolitan Music Awards.

Discography

Albums

Singles

Collaborative singles

References

1943 births
Living people
American women country singers
American country singer-songwriters
Hickory Records artists
MCA Records artists
Elektra Records artists
Singer-songwriters from Missouri
People from Vienna, Missouri
Country musicians from Missouri
21st-century American women